The former Royal Air Force Swanton Morley, more commonly known as RAF Swanton Morley, was a Royal Air Force station in Norfolk, England, located near to the village of Swanton Morley.  The site, now known as Robertson Barracks, is occupied by the Queen's Dragoon Guards.

History
Swanton Morley was a new station planned under the RAF expansion scheme but not completed before the start of the Second World War. It was part of 2 Group, RAF Bomber Command until December 1944 when it was given over to 100 Group – the RAF unit responsible for countering German defences against the British strategic bombing  – as they needed another airfield close to their HQ at Bylaugh Hall.

On 4 July 1942, American and British airmen took off from this station as part of the first combined bombing raid of World War II. 226 Squadron RAF had been tutoring the US 15th Bombardment Squadron. Both Winston Churchill and General Eisenhower were at RAF Swanton Morley for this mission, which saw six crews from 15th Bombardment Squadron fly a raid with six crews from the RAF, using Boston light bombers belonging to 226 Squadron. The raid was made at low level against German airfields in the Netherlands. During the Second World War the station was home to the Bomber Support Development Unit (BSDU) of 100 Group.

After the Second World War the station was home to No. 1 Air Signallers' School, and the Radio Warfare Establishment RAF, which later moved to RAF Watton. At a later date Swanton Morley became home to the Central Servicing Development Establishment (CSDE) and the Maintenance Analysis and Computing Establishment (MACE), formerly known as the Maintenance Data Centre (MDC).

From June 1953 to 1995 the station was also used by 611 Volunteer Gliding School, when the station was listed for closure under Options for Change. The station held popular airshows during the 1980s.

On 6 September 1995 the station was transferred to the British Army and renamed Robertson Barracks.

Facilities
The station was equipped with a grass surface airfield with three main runways, a perimeter track with 31 loop hardstandings, four T-type hangars, four blister hangars and one J-type hangar.  The station was also equipped with a Watch Office with Met. Section, utility buildings and barracks for a total staff of 1,968 males and 390 females.

Squadrons and other units
The following units were here at some point:

See also

List of former Royal Air Force stations

References

Citations

Bibliography

External links
  Documentary on the first US/UK air raid of World War 2, flown from this station.

Royal Air Force stations in Norfolk
Royal Air Force stations of World War II in the United Kingdom